Hereford Barton railway station was a station in Hereford, Herefordshire, England.

History
The station was opened on 2 January 1854 and closed on 2 January 1893. The station was demolished in 1913.

Stationmasters
John Walker 1853 - 1880
John H. Cotterall ca. 1881
Thomas Jones 1891 - 1900 (afterwards station master at Abergavenny)
Charles James Field 1901 - 1906

References

Sources

Further reading

Disused railway stations in Herefordshire
Former Great Western Railway stations
Railway stations in Great Britain opened in 1854
Railway stations in Great Britain closed in 1893